Arsenate minerals usually refer to the naturally occurring orthoarsenates, possessing the (AsO4)3− anion group and, more rarely, other arsenates with anions like AsO3(OH)2− (also written HAsO42−) (example: pharmacolite Ca(AsO3OH).2H2O) or (very rarely) [AsO2(OH)2]− (example: andyrobertsite). Arsenite minerals are much less common. Both the Dana and the Strunz mineral classifications place the arsenates in with the phosphate minerals.

Example arsenate minerals include:
Annabergite Ni3(AsO4)2·8H2O
Austinite CaZn(AsO4)(OH)
Clinoclase Cu3(AsO4)(OH)3
Conichalcite CaCu(AsO4)(OH)
Cornubite Cu5(AsO4)2(OH)4
Cornwallite Cu2+5(AsO4)2(OH)2
Erythrite Co3(AsO4)2·8H2O
Mimetite Pb5(AsO4)3Cl
Olivenite Cu2(AsO4)OH

Nickel–Strunz Classification -08- Phosphates 
IMA-CNMNC proposes a new hierarchical scheme (Mills et al., 2009). This list uses it to modify the Classification of Nickel–Strunz (mindat.org, 10 ed, pending publication).

Abbreviations:
"*" - discredited (IMA/CNMNC status).
"?" - questionable/doubtful (IMA/CNMNC status).
"REE" - Rare-earth element (Sc, Y, La, Ce, Pr, Nd, Pm, Sm, Eu, Gd, Tb, Dy, Ho, Er, Tm, Yb, Lu)
"PGE" - Platinum-group element (Ru, Rh, Pd, Os, Ir, Pt)
03.C Aluminofluorides, 06 Borates, 08 Vanadates (04.H V[5,6] Vanadates), 09 Silicates:
Neso: insular (from Greek νησος nēsos, island)
Soro: grouping (from Greek σωροῦ sōros, heap, mound (especially of corn))
Cyclo: ring
Ino: chain (from Greek ις [genitive: ινος inos], fibre)  
Phyllo: sheet (from Greek φύλλον phyllon, leaf) 
Tekto: three-dimensional framework
Nickel–Strunz code scheme: NN.XY.##x
NN: Nickel–Strunz mineral class number
X: Nickel–Strunz mineral division letter
Y: Nickel–Strunz mineral family letter
##x: Nickel–Strunz mineral/group number, x add-on letter

Class: arsenates and vanadates 
 08.A Arsenates and vanadates without additional anions, without H2O
 08.AA With small cations (some also with larger ones): 05 Alarsite
 08.AB With medium-sized cations: 25 Xanthiosite, 30 Lammerite, 35 Mcbirneyite, 35 Stranskiite, 35 Pseudolyonsite, 40 Lyonsite
 08.AC With medium-sized and large cations: 05 Howardevansite; 10 Arseniopleite, 10 Caryinite, 10 Johillerite, 10 Nickenichite, 10 Bradaczekite, 10 Yazganite, 10 Odanielite; 25 Berzeliite, 25 Manganberzeliite, 25 Palenzonaite, 25 Schäferite; 75 Ronneburgite, 80 Tillmannsite, 85 Filatovite 
 08.AD With only large cations: 10 Weilite, 10 Svenekite; 30 Schultenite, 35 Chernovite-(Y), 35 Dreyerite, 35 Wakefieldite-(La), 35 Wakefieldite-(Nd), 35 Wakefieldite-(Ce), 35 Wakefieldite-(Y); 40 Pucherite, 50 Gasparite-(Ce), 50 Rooseveltite; 55 Tetrarooseveltite, 60 Chursinite, 65 Clinobisvanite
 08.B Arsenates and vanadates with additional anions, without H2O
 08.BA With small and medium-sized cations: 10 Bergslagite
 08.BB With only medium-sized cations, (OH, etc.):RO4 £1:1: 15 Sarkinite; 30 Zincolivenite, 30 Eveite, 30 Olivenite, 30 Adamite, 30 Auriacusite; 35 Paradamite, 40 Wilhelmkleinite, 50 Namibite, 60 Urusovite, 65 Theoparacelsite, 70 Turanite, 75 Stoiberite, 80 Fingerite, 85 Averievite
 08.BC With only medium-sized cations, (OH, etc.):RO4 > 1:1 and < 2:1: 05 Angelellite, 15 Aerugite
 08.BD With only medium-sized cations, (OH, etc.):RO4 = 2:1: 05 Cornwallite, 10 Arsenoclasite, 15 Parwelite, 20 Reppiaite, 30 Cornubite
 08.BE With only medium-sized cations, (OH, etc.):RO4 > 2:1: 20 Clinoclase, 25 Gilmarite, 25 Arhbarite, 30 Allactite, 30 Flinkite, 35 Chlorophoenicite, 35 Magnesiochlorophoenicite, 40 Gerdtremmelite, 45 Arakiite, 45 Kraisslite, 45 Dixenite, 45 Hematolite, 45 Mcgovernite, 45 Turtmannite, 45 Carlfrancisite, 50 Synadelphite, 55 Holdenite, 60 Kolicite, 65 Sabelliite, 70 Jarosewichite, 75 Theisite, 80 Coparsite 
 08.BF With medium-sized and large cations, (OH, etc.):RO4 < 0.5:1: 20 Nabiasite
 08.BG With medium-sized and large cations, (OH, etc.):RO4 = 0.5:1: 05 Arsenbrackebuschite, 05 Brackebuschite, 05 Gamagarite, 05 Arsentsumebite, 05 Feinglosite, 05 Bushmakinite, 05 Tokyoite, 05 Calderonite
 08.BH With medium-sized and large cations, (OH, etc.):RO4 = 1:1: 10 Durangite, 10 Maxwellite, 10 Tilasite; 30 Carminite, 30 Sewardite; 35 Austinite, 35 Adelite, 35 Duftite, 35 Arsendescloizite, 35 Conichalcite, 35 Gabrielsonite, 35 Nickelaustinite, 35 Cobaltaustinite, 35 Tangeite, 35 Gottlobite; 40 Descloizite, 40 Cechite, 40 Pyrobelonite, 40 Mottramite; 45 Bayldonite, 45 Vesignieite; 50 Paganoite, 65 Leningradite
 08.BK With medium-sized and large cations, (OH, etc.): 10 Medenbachite, 10 Cobaltneustadtelite, 10 Neustadtelite, 20 Heyite, 25 Jamesite
 08.BL With medium-sized and large cations, (OH, etc.):RO4 = 3:1: 05 Beudantite, 05 Hidalgoite, 05 Gallobeudantite, 05 Kemmlitzite, 10 Segnitite, 10 Arsenogorceixite, 10 Arsenocrandallite, 10 Arsenogoyazite, 10 Dussertite, 10 Philipsbornite, 13 Arsenowaylandite, 13 Arsenoflorencite-(Ce), 13 Arsenoflorencite-(La), 13 Arsenoflorencite-(Nd), 13 Graulichite-(Ce) 
 08.BM With medium-sized and large cations, (OH, etc.):RO4 = 4:1: 05 Retzian-(Ce), 05 Retzian-(La), 05 Retzian-(Nd), 10 Kolitschite
 08.BN With only large cations, (OH, etc.):RO4 = 0.33:1: 05 Fermorite, 05 Johnbaumite-M, 05 Johnbaumite, 05 Clinomimetite, 05 Hedyphane, 05 Mimetite-M, 05 Mimetite, 05 Morelandite, 05 Svabite, 05 Turneaureite, 05 Vanadinite
 08.BO With only large cations, (OH, etc.):RO4 1:1: 10 Preisingerite, 10 Schumacherite, 15 Atelestite, 15 Hechtsbergite, 20 Kombatite, 20 Sahlinite, 35 Kuznetsovite, 45 Schlegelite
 08.C Arsenates and vanadates without additional anions, with H2O
 08.CA With small and large/medium cations: 30 Arsenohopeite, 35 Warikahnite, 50 Keyite, 55 Pushcharovskite, 60 Prosperite
 08.CB With only medium-sized cations, RO4:H2O = 1:1: 10 Nyholmite, 10 Miguelromeroite, 10 Sainfeldite, 10 Villyaellenite; 15 Krautite, 15 Fluckite; 20 Cobaltkoritnigite, 20 Koritnigite; 25 Yvonite, 30 Geminite, 35 Schubnelite, 40 Radovanite, 45 Kazakhstanite, 50 Kolovratite, 55 Irhtemite, 60 Burgessite
 08.CC With only medium-sized cations, RO4:H2O = 1:1.5: 10 Kaatialaite, 15 Leogangite
 08.CD With only medium-sized cations, RO4:H2O = 1:2: 10 Mansfieldite, 10 Scorodite, 10 Yanomamite; 15 Parascorodite, 25 Sterlinghillite, 30 Rollandite
 08.CE With only medium-sized cations, RO4:H2O £1:2.5: 05 Geigerite, 05 Chudobaite, 15 Brassite, 20 Rosslerite, 30 Veselovskyite, 30 Ondrušite, 30 Lindackerite, 30 Pradetite; 40 Ferrisymplesite, 40 Manganohörnesite, 40 Annabergite, 40 Erythrite, 40 Hörnesite, 40 Köttigite, 40 Parasymplesite, 45 Symplesite, 60 Kaňkite, 65 Steigerite, 70 Metaschoderite, 70 Schoderite, 85 Metaköttigite
 08.CF With large and medium-sized cations, RO4:H2O > 1:1: 05 Grischunite
 08.CG With large and medium-sized cations, RO4:H2O = 1:1: 05 Gaitite, 05 Parabrandtite, 05 Talmessite, 10 Roselite, 10 Rruffite, 10 Brandtite, 10 Zincroselite, 10 Wendwilsonite, 15 Ferrilotharmeyerite, 15 Cabalzarite, 15 Lotharmeyerite, 15 Cobaltlotharmeyerite, 15 Mawbyite, 15 Cobalttsumcorite, 15 Nickellotharmeyerite, 15 Schneebergite, 15 Nickelschneebergite, 15 Tsumcorite, 15 Thometzekite, 15 Manganlotharmeyerite, 15 Mounanaite, 15 Krettnichite; 20 Zincgartrellite, 20 Lukrahnite, 20 Gartrellite, 20 Helmutwinklerite, 20 Rappoldite, 20 Phosphogartrellite; 25 Pottsite, 35 Nickeltalmessite
 08.CH With large and medium-sized cations, RO4:H2O < 1:1: 05 Walentaite, 15 Picropharmacolite; 55 Smolianinovite, 55 Fahleite; 60 Barahonaite-(Fe), 60 Barahonaite-(Al)
 08.CJ With only large cations: 20 Haidingerite, 25 Vladimirite, 30 Ferrarisite, 35 Machatschkiite; 40 Phaunouxite, 40 Rauenthalite; 50 Pharmacolite, 55 Mcnearite, 65 Sincosite, 65 Bariosincosite, 75 Guerinite
 08.D arsenates and vanadates
 08.DA With small (and occasionally larger) cations: 05 Bearsite, 35 Philipsburgite, 50 Ianbruceite
 08.DB With only medium-sized cations, (OH, etc.):RO4 < 1:1: 05 Pitticite, 35 Sarmientite, 40 Bukovskyite, 45 Zykaite, 75 Braithwaiteite
 08.DC With only medium-sized cations, (OH, etc.):RO4 = 1:1 and < 2:1: 07 Euchroite, 10 Legrandite, 12 Strashimirite; 15 Arthurite, 15 Ojuelaite, 15 Cobaltarthurite, 15 Bendadaite; 20 Coralloite, 30 Maghrebite, 32 Tinticite, 55 Mapimite, 57 Ogdensburgite
 08.DD With only medium-sized cations, (OH, etc.):RO4 = 2:1: 05 Chenevixite, 05 Luetheite; 10 Akrochordite, 10 Guanacoite
 08.DE With only medium-sized cations, (OH, etc.):RO4 = 3:1: 15 Bulachite, 25 Ceruleite, 40 Juanitaite
 08.DF With only medium-sized cations, (OH, etc.):RO4 > 3:1: 10 Liskeardite, 15 Rusakovite, 20 Liroconite, 30 Chalcophyllite, 35 Parnauite
 08.DG With large and medium-sized cations, (OH, etc.):RO4 < 0.5:1: 05 Shubnikovite, 05 Lavendulan, 05 Lemanskiite, 05 Zdenekite
 08.DH With large and medium-sized cations, (OH, etc.):RO4 < 1:1: 30 Arseniosiderite, 30 Kolfanite, 30 Sailaufite; 45 Mahnertite; 50 Andyrobertsite, 50 Calcioandyrobertsite; 60 Bouazzerite
 08.DJ With large and medium-sized cations, (OH, etc.):RO4 = 1:l: 15 Camgasite, 45 Attikaite
 08.DK With large and medium-sized cations, (OH, etc.):RO4 > 1:1 and < 2:1: Richelsdorfite, 10 Bariopharmacosiderite, 10 Pharmacosiderite, 10 Natropharmacosiderite, 10 Hydroniumpharmacosiderite; 12 Pharmacoalumite, 12 Natropharmacoalumite, 12 Bariopharmacoalumite 
 08.DL With large and medium-sized cations, (OH, etc.):RO4 = 2:1: 15 Agardite-(Ce), 15 Agardite-(La), 15 Agardite-(Nd), 15 Agardite-(Y), 15 Goudeyite, 15 Zalesiite, 15 Mixite, 15 Plumboagardite; 20 Cheremnykhite, 20 Dugganite, 20 Wallkilldellite-(Fe), 20 Wallkilldellite-(Mn)
 08.DM With large and medium-sized cations, (OH, etc.):RO4 > 2:1: 05 Esperanzaite, 10 Clinotyrolite, 10 Tyrolite, 15 Betpakdalite-CaCa, 15 Betpakdalite-NaCa, 20 Phosphovanadylite-Ba, 20 Phosphovanadylite-Ca, 25 Yukonite, 40 Santafeite
 08.E Uranyl arsenates
 08.EA UO2:RO4 = 1:2: 05 Orthowalpurgite, 05 Walpurgite; 10 Hallimondite 
 08.EB UO2:RO4 = 1:1: 05 Metarauchite, 05 Heinrichite, 05 Kahlerite, 05 Novacekite, 05 Uranospinite, 05 Zeunerite; 10 Metazeunerite, 10 Metauranospinite, 10 Metaheinrichite, 10 Metakahlerite, 10 Metakirchheimerite, 10 Metalodevite, 10 Metanovacekite; 15 Uramarsite, 15 Trogerite, 15 Abernathyite, 15 Natrouranospinite; 20 Chistyakovaite, 25 Arsenuranospathite
 08.EC UO2:RO4 = 3:2: 10 Arsenuranylite, 15 Hugelite, 20 Arsenovanmeersscheite, 45 Nielsbohrite
 08.ED Unclassified: 10 Asselbornite
 08.F Polyarsenates and [4]-polyvanadates
 08.FA Polyarsenates and [4]-polyvanadates, without OH and H2O; dimers of corner-sharing RO4 tetrahedra: 05 Blossite, 10 Ziesite, 15 Chervetite, 25 Petewilliamsite
 08.FC [4]-Polyvanadates, with H2O only: 05 Fianelite, 15 Pintadoite
 08.FD [4]-Polyvanadates, with OH and H2O: 05 Martyite, 05 Volborthite
 08.FE Ino-[4]-vanadates: 05 Ankinovichite, 05 Alvanite
 08.X Unclassified Strunz arsenates and vanadates

References